The Romanoffs is an American anthology drama streaming television series created, written, produced, and directed by Matthew Weiner. It premiered on Amazon Prime Video October 12, 2018 and features an ensemble cast that differs from episode to episode, with John Slattery, JJ Feild, Louise Bourgoin, Aaron Eckhart, and Diane Lane appearing across multiple episodes. In July 2019, Amazon announced they have no plans for a second season.

Premise
The Romanoffs is a contemporary series "set around the globe, centering on separate stories about people who believe themselves to be descendants of the Russian royal family."

Cast and characters

"The Violet Hour"
Aaron Eckhart as Greg
Marthe Keller as Anushka
Louise Bourgoin as Sophie
Inès Melab as Hajar
Darina Al Joundi as Raha Azim
Mouss Zouheyri as Mohammed Azim
Mounir Amamra as Amir Azim
Franc Bruneau as JP
Vernon Dobtcheff as M. Audran
Evelyne Dandry as Mme. Audran
Xavier Thiam as Dr. Shrom
Salomé Diénis Meulien as Sonya
Laurent Bateau as Denis

"The Royal We"
Corey Stoll as Michael Romanoff
Kerry Bishé as Shelly Romanoff
Janet Montgomery as Michelle Westbrook
Noah Wyle as Ivan Novak
Jonathan Ho as Jesse
Braeden Lemasters as Andrew
Larry Bates as Daryl
Brian Bisson as Scott
Nora Sheehan as Mona
Arlene Duncan as Prosecutor Dion
James Naughton as Dmitri
Elva Mai Hoover as June
John Slattery as Daniel Reese
Shannon Wilcox as Natalie

"House of Special Purpose"
Christina Hendricks as Olivia Rogers
Jack Huston as Samuel Ryan
Paul Reiser as Bob Isaacson
Isabelle Huppert as Jacqueline Gerard
Mike Doyle as Brian Norris
JJ Feild as Jack
Mark Valley as Steve Lewis
Evgenia Brik as Katrina
Morten Suurballe as Max Gruber
Ivan G'Vera as Lalzo Barta
Goran Navojec as Karl
Thomas Nash as Hans

"Expectation"
Amanda Peet as Julia Wells
Jon Tenney as Eric Ford
Emily Rudd as Ella Hopkins
Mary Kay Place as Marilyn Hopkins
Michael O’Neill as Ron Hopkins
John Slattery as Daniel Reese
Diane Lane as Katherine Ford
Janne Mortil as Gloria
David Ferry as Gary Beethoven

"Bright and High Circle"
Diane Lane as Katherine Ford
Andrew Rannells as David Patton
Cara Buono as Debbie Newman
Nicole Ari Parker as Cheryl Gowans
Ron Livingston as Alex Myers
Thaddeaus Ek as Benji Myers
Joshua Carlon as Henry Myers
Uriah Shelton as Julian Myers
Alexandra Barreto as Detective Gutierrez

"Panorama"
Radha Mitchell as Victoria Hayward
Juan Pablo Castañeda as Abel
Griffin Dunne as Frank Shefflied
Paul Luke Bonenfant as Nick Hayward
David Sutcliffe as Phillip Hayward
Roberto Medina as Dr. Eduardo Siquieros
Maria Evoli as Lourdes Gonzalez
Scarlet Dergal as The Receptionist
Sandra Quiroz as Nurse Ortega
Paul Gregory as Rupert Stanley

"End of the Line"
Kathryn Hahn as Anka Garner
Jay R. Ferguson as Joe Garner
Annet Mahendru as Elena Evanovich
Clea DuVall as Patricia Callahan
Stephanie McVay as Barb Callahan
Marina Weis as Mrs. Fedunov
Anastasija Marcenkaité as Vera
Zofia Wichłacz as Nadya
Dalina Costin as Dalina Costin
Sophia Chitu as Zoya

"The One That Holds Everything"
Hugh Skinner as Simon Burrows
Hera Hilmar as Ondine
Ben Miles as George Burrows
JJ Feild as Jack
Jing Lusi as Kiera Ming
Adèle Anderson as Candace
Oliver Zetterström as Young Simon
Deirdre Mullins as Natalie Burrows
Rebecca Root as Dana
Jane Perry as Belinda
Christopher Goh as Christopher Ming

Episodes

Production

Development
On October 26, 2016, multiple news outlets reported that Amazon had won a bidding war among six  entities and committed to a straight-to-series order with a $70 million budget for an eight episode first season. The series was to be written, directed, and produced by Mad Men creator Matthew Weiner in cooperation with The Weinstein Company.

On August 29, 2017, the series' creative team was announced. The series’ collaborators include executive producer/writer Semi Chellas, co-executive producers Kriss Turner Towner, Blake McCormick, and Kathy Ciric, along with consulting producers/writers Andre Jacquemetton and Maria Jacquemetton. The series behind-the-scenes creative team includes director of photography Christopher Manley, costume designers Janie Bryant and Wendy Chuck, production designers Henry Dunn and Christopher Brown, and hair and makeup designers Theraesa Rivers and Lana Horochowski. The casting team includes Carrie Audino, Laura Schiff, and Kendra Clark. On October 11, 2017, following reports of sexual abuse allegations against producer Harvey Weinstein, Amazon announced that they were "reviewing their options" in regard to their relationship with The Weinstein Company. They subsequently severed ties with the production company. On July 28, 2018, it was announced during the Television Critics Association's annual summer press tour that the series would premiere on October 12, 2018.

Casting
From August to October 2017, a series of announcements revealed that Isabelle Huppert, Christina Hendricks, John Slattery, Jack Huston, Amanda Peet, Marthe Keller, Aaron Eckhart, Corey Stoll, Andrew Rannells, Mike Doyle, JJ Feild, Janet Montgomery, Paul Reiser, and Diane Lane had been cast in the series.

From March to August 2018, numerous guest cast members were announced. These actors included Noah Wyle, Hera Hilmar, Kathryn Hahn, Kerry Bishé, Jay R. Ferguson, Ben Miles, Mary Kay Place, Griffin Dunne, Cara Buono, Ron Livingston, Jon Tenney, Clea DuVall, Radha Mitchell, Hugh Skinner, Juan Pablo Castañeda, Emily Rudd, Adele Anderson, Annet Mahendru, Louise Bourgoin, Inès Melab, Michael O'Neill, and David Sutcliffe.

Filming
Filming took place in Constanța, Romania from March 14 to March 18, 2018.

Release

Marketing
On July 28, 2018, the first teaser trailer for the series was released. On August 14, 2018, a second teaser trailer was released. On August 29, 2018, a series of "first look" promotional photographs from the series was released alongside a full episode lineup of the series featuring episode titles, synopsis, airdates, and a list of actors that would appear in each episode. On September 12, 2018, the trailer for the series was released.

Premiere
On November 15, 2018, the series held its official premiere at the Los Angeles County Museum of Art in Los Angeles, California featuring a screening of the series. A red carpet arrival was originally scheduled to take place before the screening but was canceled out of respect for the victims of the Woolsey Fire, which was still burning in the Los Angeles and Ventura counties.

Reception

Critical response
The series was met with a mixed response from critics upon its premiere. On the review aggregation website Rotten Tomatoes, the first season holds a 48% approval rating, with an average rating of 5.8 out of 10 based on 64 reviews. The website's critical consensus reads, "Matthew Weiner's return to television is as handsomely made as it is ambitious and sprawling—unfortunately, it's also fatally indulgent, asking for the utmost patience from audiences without a compelling incentive." Metacritic, which uses a weighted average, assigned the season a score of 56 out of 100 based on 25 critics, indicating "mixed or average reviews".

Despite the polarizing reception to the series overall, it went on to be nominated for awards for its work in the production, audio engineering and costume design for the series.

Awards and nominations

References

External links

2010s American anthology television series
2010s American drama television series
2018 American television series debuts
2018 American television series endings
Amazon Prime Video original programming
English-language television shows
Television series by Amazon Studios